Pleasant Hill is an unincorporated community in northwestern Northampton County, North Carolina, United States.

The people of the area were free blacks who married into the Haliwa Saponis, creating a distinctive Native American tribe, which now has 4000 surviving members.  The majority of Haliwa Saponis live in the Halifax County area of North Carolina.  In Pleasant Hill, the Broady family members tied to Chief Mountain are the only Haliwa Saponis in the Pleasant Hill area.   In 1848, Pleasant Hill was a stop on the Petersburg Railroad, and is part of the Roanoke Rapids, North Carolina Micropolitan Statistical Area.

References

Unincorporated communities in Northampton County, North Carolina
Unincorporated communities in North Carolina
Roanoke Rapids, North Carolina micropolitan area